John Horn may refer to:

*John A. Horn (born 1968), former United States Attorney
John J. Horn (1917–1999), American labor leader and politician from New Jersey
John L. Horn (1928–2006), American psychologist
John Horn (tennis) (1931–2001), British tennis player
John Horn Jr. (1843–1920), awarded a Congressional Gold Medal in 1874 for a career rescuing people from drowning
Steve Horn (John Stephen Horn, 1931–2011), American politician from California

See also
John Horn High School, a secondary school in Mesquite, Texas, United States
John Horne (disambiguation)